Chromodomain-helicase-DNA-binding protein 2 is an enzyme that in humans is encoded by the CHD2 gene.

Function 

The CHD family of proteins is characterized by the presence of chromo (chromatin organization modifier) domains and SNF2-related helicase/ATPase domains. CHD genes alter gene expression possibly by modification of chromatin structure thus altering access of the transcriptional apparatus to its chromosomal DNA template. CHD2 catalyzes the assembly of chromatin into periodic arrays; and the N-terminal region of CHD2, which contains tandem chromodomains, serves an auto-inhibitory role in both the DNA-binding and ATPase activities of CHD2.  Alternatively spliced transcript variants encoding distinct isoforms have been found for this gene.

Clinical significance 

De novo mutations and deletions in this gene have been associated with cases of epileptic encephalopathies.

CHD2 epilepsy is increasingly being identified as a subpopulation of Lennox-Gastaut Syndrome.

CHD2 myoclonic encephalopathy is a condition characterized by recurrent seizures (epilepsy), abnormal brain function (encephalopathy), and intellectual disability. Epilepsy begins in childhood, typically between ages 6 months and 4 years. Each individual may experience a variety of seizure types, most commonly myoclonic seizures.

Recently, de novo mutations or deletions in CHD2 has been linked to intellectual disability and to autism. Researchers found 27 genes which abolish function of the corresponding protein — in at least two people with autism, and 6 genes are mutated in three or more people with autism. These six genes — CHD8, DYRK1A, ANK2, GRIN2B, DSCAM and CHD2 — are the strongest autism candidates identified so far.

Family support 

Syndromes associated with mutations or deletions in CHD2 can be devastating. Families of individuals with CHD2 mutations or deletions can join the CHD2 research and support group on Facebook  or find information and support through the non-profit organization Coalition to Cure CHD2.

References

Further reading

External links